Kenyan Riders Downunder was a Kenyan registered, Australian based, UCI Continental team that operated in 2016. It participated in some of the top events in Australia. The team was formed from the merger of two teams, the Kenyan Riders and Pro Team Downunder and was the first UCI Continental team to be registered in East Africa.

Team roster

Major wins
2016
 National Road Race Championships, Jason Christie

National champions
2016
 New Zealand Road Race, Jason Christie

References

External links
 

UCI Continental Teams (Africa)
Cycling teams based in Kenya
Cycling teams established in 2016